William Henson (27 May 1887 – 4 April 1964) was a British wrestler. He competed in the men's freestyle lightweight at the 1908 Summer Olympics.

References

External links
 

1887 births
1964 deaths
British male sport wrestlers
Olympic wrestlers of Great Britain
Wrestlers at the 1908 Summer Olympics
Place of birth missing